"Make My Day" is a pop song by Japanese recording artist Yui Aragaki. It was released as her first single on July 16, 2008.

Background and composition
"Make My Day" is a pop-rock song written and produced by Japanese singer-songwriter Keito Blow. It was released in three limited editions: edition A, which has an illustration cover drawn by Aragaki herself, edition B, which comes with a DVD including three live performances and edition C, which comes with a DVD including three music videos and off-shot footage.

Aragaki gave Blow a list of themes she wanted her music to reflect and Blow used it as inspiration to write the song, as well as the b-side "I Believe". The second b-side, "Soba ni", was written by Aragaki herself and talks about the many things one can notice in a Shibuya crowd.

"Make My Day" was used as theme song for the Fuji TV drama 81diver, starring Junpei Mizobata and Riisa Naka.

Chart performance
"Make My Day" debuted on the daily Oricon singles chart at #1 with 11,499 copies sold. It peaked at #2 on the weekly charts with 53,471 copies sold. The song debuted at #1 on the Billboard Japan Hot 100 chart "Make My Day" was the 12th best selling single for the month of July and 88th best selling single of the year.

Track listing

Charts, sales and certification

Chart positions

Sales and certification

Release history

References

External links

2008 debut singles
Billboard Japan Hot 100 number-one singles
Japanese television drama theme songs
Warner Music Japan singles
2008 songs